On 10 January 2020, a suicide bombing inside a Taliban-run mosque killed at least 15 people in Quetta, Pakistan. At least 19 others were injured.

Background 
Earlier, on 7 January 2020, a motorcycle bombing took place near a Frontier Corps vehicle on McConaghey Road near Liaquat Bazar in Quetta. The attack killed two people and injured another 14 others. According to reports, Jamaat-ul-Ahrar as well as Baloch terrorists claimed responsibility for the attack.

Bombing 
On 10 January 2020, a suicide bombing took place inside a Taliban-run mosque located in Ghousabad neighbourhood during Maghrib prayer in Quetta's Satellite Town area. The bomb had been planted inside a seminary in the mosque. Among the killed was a Deputy Superintendent of Police, the apparent target of the attack, along with 14 civilians. At least 19 others were injured. The Islamic State claimed responsibility for the bombing. They said the bombing caused 60 casualties, including 20 dead.

Response
Bomb disposal squad and security personnel swept through the mosque and its surrounding area for evidence. The area was cordoned off and Frontier Corps personnel along with the police carried out a search operation. On 11 January 2020, a first information report was registered by the Counter Terrorism Department against unknown suspects.

References 

2020 in Balochistan, Pakistan
2020 murders in Pakistan 
January 2020 bombing
21st-century mass murder in Pakistan
Attacks on buildings and structures in 2020
January 2020 bombing
Mosque bombings in Pakistan
ISIL terrorist incidents in Pakistan
Islamic terrorist incidents in 2020
January 2020 crimes in Asia
January 2020 events in Pakistan
Mass murder in 2020
January 2020 bombing
Motorcycle bombings
Suicide bombings in 2020 
January 2020
Terrorist incidents in Pakistan in 2020
Mosque bombings by Islamists